is a passenger railway station located in the western area of the city of  Fujisawa, Kanagawa Prefecture, Japan, operated by the East Japan Railway Company (JR East).

Lines
Tsujidō Station is served by the Tōkaidō Main Line, with some through services via the Shōnan-Shinjuku Line. The station is 54.8 km from Tokyo Station.

Station layout
The station consists one island platform, serving two tracks with an elevatedstation building above the platform. The station has a Midori no Madoguchi staffed ticket office.

Platforms

History
Tsujido Station opened on 1 December 1916. With the dissolution and privatization of JNR on April 1, 1987, the station came under the control of the East Japan Railway Company.

Passenger statistics
In fiscal 2019, the station was used by an average of 59,409 passengers daily (boarding passengers only).

The passenger figures (boarding passengers only) for previous years are as shown below.

Surrounding area

North Exit
 Terrace Mall Shonan shopping mall

South Exit
 Shonan Institute of Technology

 Shirahama Special Needs School

See also
List of railway stations in Japan

References
Yoshikawa, Fumio. Tokaido-sen 130-nen no ayumi. Grand-Prix Publishing (2002)

External links

 Tsujidō Station information 

Railway stations in Japan opened in 1916
Railway stations in Kanagawa Prefecture
Shōnan-Shinjuku Line
Tōkaidō Main Line
Railway stations in Fujisawa, Kanagawa